Charles Trelawny may refer to:
 Charles Trelawny (died 1731), soldier and MP for East Looe and Plymouth
 Charles Trelawny (died 1764), MP for Liskeard
 Charles Trelawny Brereton, born Charles Trelawny (died 1820), MP for Mitchell